Orocrambus oppositus is a moth in the family Crambidae. It was described by Alfred Philpott in 1915. It is endemic to New Zealand, where it has been recorded in Fiordland. It is found in alpine grasslands.

The wingspan is 29–31 mm. The forewings are dark bronze. The hindwings of the males are grey-brown, while those of the females are white. Adults are on wing from December to February.

References

Crambinae
Moths described in 1915
Moths of New Zealand
Endemic fauna of New Zealand
Endemic moths of New Zealand